Xing Yu (born 12 March 1991, in Beijing, China) is a Chinese archer. At the 2012 and 2016 Summer Olympics he competed for his country in the Men's individual and team events.  At the 2012 Summer Olympics, he finished reached the second round of the men's individual, where he lost to Khairul Anuar Mohamad.  In the team event, the Chinese men's team finished in 7th, losing to Italy in the quarter finals.  At the 2016 Olympics, he lost in the first round to Riau Ega Agatha.  The men's team finished in 4th, losing the bronze medal match to Australia.

References

External links
 
 

Chinese male archers
1991 births
Living people
Olympic archers of China
Archers at the 2012 Summer Olympics
Archers at the 2016 Summer Olympics
Sportspeople from Beijing
Asian Games medalists in archery
Archers at the 2010 Asian Games
Asian Games silver medalists for China
Medalists at the 2010 Asian Games
21st-century Chinese people